Augignac is a commune in the Dordogne department in Nouvelle-Aquitaine in southwestern France.

Augignac is located between Nontron and Piégut-Pluviers in the heart of the Parc Naturel Régional de Périgord-Limousin

Population

See also
Communes of the Dordogne department

References

Communes of Dordogne